The Sheriff of Canterbury is a shrievalty in the city of Canterbury, England.  The office was first held in 1461 by Richard Carpenter, when a charter of king Edward IV granted the city the perpetual status of a county independent of Kent itself.  The role was at that time involved in police and legal functions (overseeing public executions, collecting taxes and having powers of arrest), but is now honorific.  The role survived the local government reorganisation of 1974, when a large number of other areas lost County Borough status and thus had their Sheriffs' posts abolished, and the Sheriff is still elected at the Annual Council Meeting in May.  Canterbury City Council in 2002 merged the role of deputy Chairman of the Council into that of Sheriff, to create a Civic Team of only the Sheriff and the Lord Mayor.

List of holders

Source:

1461 Richard Carpenter :first Sheriff of Canterbury
1462 Hamon Bele
1463 John Bygge
1464 John Wattys
1465 William Bele
1466 Walter Hopton
1467 Richard Carpenter
1468 John Bygge
1469 Thomas Atte Wode
1470 William Faunt
1471 Nicholas Sheldewych
1522 Robert Lewys : MP for Canterbury, 1539 and 1545
1529 John Starky : MP for Canterbury, 1539
1530 Francis Rutland
1531 James Thomson
1532 John Johnson
1533 John Toftos
1534 John Alcock
1535 John Hobbys
1536 Thomas Calowe
1537 George Webbe : MP for Canterbury, 1553 
1538 William Copyn : MP for Canterbury, 1553 and 1554
1539 Henry Gere
1540 John Fuller
1541 Robert Brown
1542 Thomas Batherste
1543 Roger Welles 
1544 John Twyne : headmaster of the newly reconstituted King's School in 1542, MP for Canterbury, 1553 and 1554.
1549 George Maye : MP for Canterbury, 1559 
1551 Thomas Walker
1563 Anthony Webbe : MP for Canterbury, 1572 
1572 Bartholomew Brome : MP for Canterbury, 1589 
1575 Bartholomew Brome : MP for Canterbury, 1589

18th century

19th century

20th century

21st century
• 2015 Robert Jones

• 2016 Rosemary Doyle

• 2017 Colin Spooner

• 2018 Jeanette Stockley

• 2019 Jeanette Stockley

• 2020 Anne Dekker

• 2021 Anne Dekker

• 2022 Louise Harvey-Quirke

See also
 Mayors of Canterbury

References

External links
www.canterbury.gov.uk

Sheriff
Sheriff
1461 establishments in England
 
Canterbury